Hackney by-election may refer to:

 1874 Hackney by-election
 1880 Hackney by-election
 1884 Hackney by-election